Turn Me On may refer to:

Albums
 Turn Me On (album), by the Honeymoon Killers, 1988
 Turn Me On (BT EP), 1999
 Turn Me On (Kim Kyu-jong EP), 2011

Songs
 "Turn Me On" (David Guetta song), 2012
 "Turn Me On" (Kevin Lyttle song), 2003
 "Turn Me On" (Mark Dinning song), 1961; covered by Nina Simone (1967) and Norah Jones (2000)
 "Turn Me On" (Riton and Oliver Heldens song), 2019
 "Turn Me On" (Sean Smith song), 2016
 "Turn Me On (Turn Me Out)", by Praxis (as "Turn Me Out"), 1994; covered by 2 Shoes (2012)
 "Turn Me On", by Accept from Balls to the Wall, 1983
 "Turn Me On", by Bad Gyal from Slow Wine Mixtape, 2016
 "Turn Me On", by Band-Maid from World Domination, 2018
 "Turn Me On", by the Fray from Scars & Stories, 2012
 "Turn Me On", by James Blunt from Some Kind of Trouble, 2010
 "Turn Me On", by Snoop Dogg from I Wanna Thank Me, 2019
 "Turn Me On", by Third Eye Blind from Screamer, 2019
 "Turn Me On", by Vitamin C from Vitamin C, 1999

Other uses
 Turn Me On, a 2007 book by Cherie Bennett

See also 
 Provócame (Spanish: Turn Me On), an album by Chayanne, 1992
 Turn Me On, Dammit!, a 2011 Norwegian film